Pas Kuhak (also Romanized as Pas Kūhak) is a village in Qarah Chaman Rural District, Arzhan District, Shiraz County, Fars Province, Iran. At the 2006 census, its population was 120, in 27 families.

References 

Populated places in Shiraz County